Saurabh Bharadwaj is an Indian politician from the Aam Aadmi Party, representing Greater Kailash constituency in the Delhi Legislative Assembly. He is currently the Vice Chairman of the Delhi Jal Board and Minister of Health , Urban development and water since 9th March , 2023 .He is also the National Chief Spokesperson Of the Aam Aadmi Party.

Early life and education
Bharadwaj was born in New Delhi and completed his early schooling from the city. He graduated as a Computer Science Engineer from Bharati Vidyapeeth's College of Engineering affiliated to Guru Gobind Singh Indraprastha University in 2003. He has also completed a bachelor's degree in law from Osmania University in 2011. Before entering politics, Bhardwaj worked with Johnson Controls India, and his expertise was in microchips and coding. Bhardwaj started his career as a software engineer in Invensys.

Political career
Saurabh Bhardwaj won the Greater Kailash assembly constituency, defeating Ajay Kumar Malhotra, son of the senior Bharatiya Janata Party leader and incumbent Leader of Opposition V.K. Malhotra, by 13092 votes in the 2013 Delhi Assembly election. In 2015, the young AAP leader defeated Rakesh Guliya of BJP by 14,583 votes. Bhardwaj was a Cabinet Minister in the Arvind Kejriwal government during the 49-day tenure between 28 December 2013 and 14 February 2014.

Bhardwaj shot to fame on 9 May, when he claimed to hack a look-alike machine similar to EVM (Electronic voting machine) allegedly used by the Election Commission. The AAP used the hacking by Bhardwaj to substantiate its claims of EVM tampering during recent elections. The Election Commission later claimed that it cannot take responsibility for any machine that is not under its own security systems and rejected the hacking attempt by Bhardwaj.

Saurabh Bhardwaj has been appointed Chief Spokesperson for Delhi unit of AAP.

On 28 June 2017, Bhardwaj filed a complaint to the Assembly Speaker against Bharatiya Janata Party MLA Manjinder Singh Sirsa for accusing the Delhi Petitions Committee of allegedly blackmailing officials.

Positions held

References 

Living people
Delhi MLAs 2013–2015
Delhi MLAs 2015–2020
Delhi MLAs 2020–2025
Aam Aadmi Party MLAs from Delhi
1979 births